Beyond Mobius is an album by pianist Cedar Walton recorded in 1976 and released on the RCA label.

Track listing 
All compositions by Cedar Walton except as indicated
 "Bad Luck" (Victor Carstarphen, Gene McFadden & John Whitehead) - 4:24  
 "Low Rider" (War, Jerry Goldstein) - 6:24  
 "Beyond Mobius" - 5:20  
 "Jive Talkin'" (Barry Gibb, Robin Gibb, Maurice Gibb) - 4:35  
 "Canadian Sunset" (Eddie Heywood, Norman Gimbel) - 5:22  
 "The Girl with Discotheque Eyes" (Walton, Mike Lipskin) - 7:24  
 "Lonely Cathedral" - 6:20

Personnel 
Cedar Walton - keyboards, synthesizer arranger, conductor
Burt Collins, Jon Faddis, Blue Mitchell - trumpet, flugelhorn
Wayne Andre, Alan Raph - trombone
George Marge, Eddie Harris - tenor saxophone
Norman Carr, Harry Cykman, David Moore, Morris Sutow - strings
Cornell Dupree, Eric Gale - rhythm guitar
Gordon Edwards - bass
Charles Collins, Jimmie Young - drums
Angel Allende - percussion
Mike Lipskin - percussion, ARP synthesizer, voice, string arranger, string conductor
Alan Abrahams, Adrienne Albert, Yolanda McCullough, Maeretha Stewart - voice
Rod Levitt - horn arranger, horn conductor, string arranger, string conductor

References 

Cedar Walton albums
1976 albums
RCA Records albums